Tielenau is a river of Schleswig-Holstein, Germany.

The Tielenau springs north of Westerborstel. It is a left tributary of the Eider south of Erfde.

See also
List of rivers of Schleswig-Holstein

References

Rivers of Schleswig-Holstein
Rivers of Germany